I Com is the first solo studio album by French singer and DJ Miss Kittin, released on 31 May 2004 by NovaMute Records. It is Miss Kittin's first solo release, having previously released albums in collaboration with The Hacker and Golden Boy. As in her previous works, electro-funk and electroclash continue to be the primary genres.

Most of the tracks on the album were produced by Miss Kittin with either Thies Mynther and Tobi Neumann (producers of Chicks on Speed). House music vocalist L.A. Williams raps on the track "Requiem for a Hit", the album's second single.

Singles
"Professional Distortion" was released as the album's lead single on 17 May 2004. It peaked at number 83 on the UK Singles Chart and at number 77 on the French Singles Chart.

The second single, "Requiem for a Hit", was released on 27 September 2004. It peaked at number 92 on the UK Singles Chart and at number six on the Belgian Dance Chart.

"Happy Violentine" was released on 14 February 2005 as the third and final single. It reached number 84 on the UK Singles Chart and number nine on the Belgian Dance Chart.

Promotion
Miss Kittin released the EP Mixing Me on 19 April 2005. The EP contains remixes of several I Com tracks such as its three singles.

Critical reception

I Com received generally favorable reviews from music critics. At Metacritic, which assigns a normalised rating out of 100 to reviews from mainstream publications, the album received an average score of 73, based on 17 reviews. Joseph Shoo of Drowned in Sound commented that I Com has the "sweet attitude of sheer independent energy" while containing "neural giddiness and cerebral edginess". Likewise, Johnny Loftus of AllMusic described I Com as "the best bits and pieces of the post-everything genres have been rearranged in a newfangled data stream to represent Miss Kittin's very elusive, entirely accessible muse. The alluring result is cool, reloaded." By contrast, Derek Miller of Pitchfork noted that "some of Kittin's lyrical deficits undercut her production."

Track listing

Personnel
Credits adapted from the liner notes of I Com.

Musicians
 Miss Kittin – vocals ; drums ; programming ; synth break 
 Otto von Schirach – programming 
 Tobi Neumann – guitar 
 L.A Williams – vocals 
 Thies Mynther – piano ; bass, synths ; programming 
 Tobi Neumann – programming ; guitar ; vocoder ; bass 
 Sue.Zuki – vocals 
 The Hacker – programming ; hectic breathing 
 Florian – vocals

Technical
 Caroline Hervé – production
 Tobias Neumann – production
 Thies Mynther – production
 Rashad – mastering

Artwork
 Wolfgang Tillmans – pictures
 Miss Kittin – drawings, studio pics
 Bente Schipp – graphic design

Charts

References

2004 debut albums
Miss Kittin albums
Novamute Records albums